Hunsonby is a civil parish in the Eden District, Cumbria, England.  It contains eight listed buildings that are recorded in the National Heritage List for England.  Of these, two are listed at Grade II*, the middle of the three grades, and the others are at Grade II, the lowest grade.  The parish contains the villages of Hunsonby, Little Salkeld and Winskill, and the surrounding countryside.  The listed buildings comprise houses and associated structure, farmhouses, farm buildings, and a working water mill.


Key

Buildings

References

Citations

Sources

Lists of listed buildings in Cumbria